Tabernaemontana panamensis is a species of plant in the family Apocynaceae. It is found in Colombia, Ecuador, Panama, and Peru.

References

panamensis
Least concern plants
Flora of Panama
Flora of South America
Plants described in 1982
Taxonomy articles created by Polbot